Irene de Miguel Pérez (born 9 May 1981) is a Spanish Podemos politician. She was elected to the Assembly of Extremadura in 2015, and has led Podemos Extremadura in the legislature since 2019.

Biography
Born in Madrid, De Miguel qualified as an agricultural engineer at the Polytechnic University of Madrid. In 2011, she moved to the remote Las Villuercas comarca of the Province of Cáceres, Extremadura to cultivate specialist fruit trees. She was one of six Podemos members elected to the Assembly of Extremadura in 2015.

In November 2018, De Miguel received 93% of the votes to lead Podemos in the 2019 Extremaduran regional election. She ran in the Badajoz constituency this time, and her party dropped to four seats. In June 2020, she ran unopposed to succeed Álvaro Jaén as secretary general of Podemos in the region, and was elected with 94.98% of votes.

References

1981 births
Living people
Politicians from Madrid
Agricultural engineers
Polytechnic University of Madrid alumni
Podemos (Spanish political party) politicians
People from the Province of Cáceres
Members of the 9th Assembly of Extremadura
Members of the 10th Assembly of Extremadura